Division 8-3A is a high school athletic conference under The Mississippi High School Athletics Association. It comprises teams in the Southeastern Region of the State of Mississippi.  Numerous sports are played in this division, including football, baseball, basketball, softball, tennis, and golf.  The teams of all MHSAA divisions can be found at the MHSAA web site.

Sports
District 8-3A will consist of the following schools for the 2009-2011 athletic years:

Collins High, Perry Central High, Seminary High, St. Patrick High, Sumrall High, and West Marion High.

Baseball

Division 8-3A won the Mississippi Class 3A State Championship in 2003 (Greene Co.), 2004 (Purvis), 2005 (Purvis),  2008 (Sumrall) & 2009 (Sumrall).

The following charts show past division winners and season results:
{| class="wikitable"
|- bgcolor="#efefef"
! Academic Year !! School !! Season Result
|-
| 2001-2002 || ||
|-
| 2002-2003 || ||
|-
| 2003-2004 || Purvis Tornadoes ||Won 3A State Championship vs. Cleveland
|-
| 2004-2005 || Purvis Tornadoes ||Won 3A State Championship vs. Senatobia
|-
| 2005-2006 || || 
|-
| 2006-2007 ||Sumrall Bobcats ||Lost 3A South State Championship vs. Purvis
|-
| 2007-2008 ||Sumrall Bobcats ||Won 3A State Championship vs. Mooreville
|-
| 2008-2009 ||Sumrall Bobcats ||Won 3A State Championship vs. South-Pontotoc

Basketball

The following charts show past division winners and season results:
{| class="wikitable"
|- bgcolor="#efefef"
! Academic Year !! School !! Season Result
|-
| 2001-2002 || ||
|-
| 2002-2003 ||Richton Rebels ||2A State Champions
|-
| 2003-2004 || ||
|-
| 2004-2005 || ||
|-
| 2005-2006 || || 
|-
| 2006-2007 || ||
|-
| 2007-2008 ||Pass Christian Pirates||Lost 3A South State Championship to Columbia

Football

The following charts show past division winners and season results:
{| class="wikitable"
|- bgcolor="#efefef"
! Academic Year !! School !! Season Result !! Final Record
|-
| 1994-1995 ||West Marion Trojans||Lost in 3A 2nd Round playoff vs. Franklin Co.||
|-
| 1995-1996 ||Poplarville Hornets||Lost in 3A 1st Round playoff vs. Raleigh||
|-
| 1996-1997 || Purvis Tornadoes ||Lost 3A 1st Round playoff vs. Prentiss||10-1
|-
| 1997-1998 || Purvis Tornadoes ||Lost 3A South State Championship vs. Magee||12-1
|-
| 1998-1999 || Purvis Tornadoes ||Lost 3A 2nd Round playoff vs. Magee||10-2
|-
| 1999-2000 ||Greene Co. Wildcats||Lost 3A 1st Round playoff vs. Forest||11-1
|-
| 2000-2001 ||Tylertown Chiefs||Won 3A 2nd playoff vs. Newton Co.||9-3
|-
| 2001-2002 ||West Marion Trojans||Lost 3A 2nd Round playoff vs. Columbia||10-1
|-
| 2002-2003 ||Greene Co. Wildcats||Lost 3A 3rd Round vs. Collins||12-1
|-
| 2003-2004 ||Tylertown Chiefs||Lost 3A 2nd Round playoff vs. Hazelhurst||11-1
|-
| 2004-2005 ||Greene Co. Wildcats||Lost 3A 2nd Round playoff vs. West Lauderdale||7-5
|-
| 2005-2006 ||Greene Co. Wildcats||Lost 3A 3rd Round playoff vs. Hazelhurst||9-3
|-
| 2006-2007 ||Raleigh Lions||Lost 3A 2nd Round playoff vs. Hazelhurst||10-2
|-
| 2007-2008 ||Greene Co. Wildcats||Lost 3A 1st Round playoff vs. Tylertown||7-4
|-
| 2008-2009 || Columbia Wildcats|| Lost 3A 3rd Round playoff vs. Franklin Co.||10-3

References
[1] Mississippi High School Activities Association

[2] Mississippi High School football history

High school sports conferences and leagues in the United States
High school sports in Mississippi